Annunziata  may refer to:

 Annunziata, Italian given name and surname
 Annunziata Polyptych, painting cycle started by Filippino Lippi and finished by Pietro Perugino

Churches 

 Annunziata, Sessa Aurunca, Baroque-style Roman Catholic church in the municipality of Sessa Aurunca, province of Caserta, in the region of Campania, southern Italy. 
 Annunziata, Venafro, a Baroque-style, Roman Catholic church located in a central part of the town of Venafro, province of Isernia, region of Molise, Italy

See also 

 Santissima Annunziata (disambiguation)